During the 1990–91 English football season, Nottingham Forest competed in the Football League First Division.

Season summary
There was chance for more success in 1991 when Forest reached their only FA Cup final under Brian Clough and went ahead after scoring an early goal against Tottenham Hotspur at Wembley, but ended up losing 2–1 in extra time after an own goal by Des Walker. In Forest's team that day was young Irish midfielder Roy Keane, who had joined the club the previous summer.

Final league table

Results
Nottingham Forest's score comes first

Legend

Football League First Division

FA Cup

League Cup

Full Members Cup

Squad

Transfers

In

Out

Transfers in:  £47,000
Transfers out:  £460,000
Total spending:  £413,000

Awards
 Roy Keane - Fans' player of the season

References

Nottingham Forest F.C. seasons
Nottingham Forest